Viktor Belskiy (22 February 1955 – 18 May 2021) was a Belarusian long jumper who represented the Soviet Union.

He finished fifth at the 1980 European Indoor Championships and sixth at the 1980 Summer Olympics, He also competed at the 1979 Summer Universiade without reaching the final. His personal best jump was 8.20 metres, achieved in  1982.

References

External links
 

1955 births
2021 deaths
Athletes from Minsk
Belarusian male long jumpers
Soviet male long jumpers
Athletes (track and field) at the 1980 Summer Olympics
Olympic athletes of the Soviet Union